These are the ATP Challenger Tour singles matches for the 2014 Trofeo Ricardo Delgado Aray.
 
Michael Russell was the defending champion, but did not participate that year.

Adrian Mannarino won the title, defeating Guido Andreozzi in the final, 4–6, 6–3, 6–2.

Seeds

  Adrian Mannarino (champion)
  Facundo Bagnis (first round)
  Facundo Argüello (quarterfinals)
  Peter Polansky (quarterfinals)
  Tatsuma Ito (quarterfinals)
  Guido Andreozzi (final)
  Andrea Collarini (first round)
  Chase Buchanan (semifinals)

Draw

Finals

Top half

Bottom half

References
 Main Draw
 Qualifying Draw

Trofeo Ricardo Delgado Aray - Singles
2014 Singles